Saaranpaskantamasaari is a small uninhabited island located in Lake Onkamojärvi in northeastern Finland, near the border with Russia.   It is administered by the municipality of Salla.

The name, in Finnish, means "an island shat by Saara".

References
 Map from the National Land Survey of Finland

Uninhabited islands of Finland
Lake islands of Finland